Statistics of American Soccer League II in season 1955–56.

League standings

Championship playoff
For the second time in ASL history there was a tie at the top of the table. Since two teams finished the season with exactly the same record and point totals, a single match championship playoff was held. In the event that this match had ended in a draw the following procedures were to be used. Two 15-minute overtime periods to be played in their entirety. If the match was still tied after 120 minutes, the teams would then play successive seven and a half minute periods until one team either scored a golden goal or earned a corner kick.

References

American Soccer League II (RSSSF)

American Soccer League (1933–1983) seasons
American Soccer League, 1955-56